Justen Blok (born 27 September 2000) is a Dutch field hockey player who plays as a defender for Rotterdam and the Dutch national team.

International career
He made his debut for the national team in early 2019. He competed at the 2021 Men's EuroHockey Nations Championship.

References

External links

2000 births
Living people
Dutch male field hockey players
Place of birth missing (living people)
Male field hockey defenders
HC Rotterdam players
Men's Hoofdklasse Hockey players
Field hockey players at the 2020 Summer Olympics
Olympic field hockey players of the Netherlands
2023 Men's FIH Hockey World Cup players
21st-century Dutch people